Uğur is a common masculine Turkish and Azerbaijani given name. In both Turkish and Azerbaijani, the word "uğur" means "luck".

Given name
 Uğur Albayrak (born 1988), Turkish footballer
 Uğur Boral (born 1982), Turkish footballer
 Uğur Çiftçi (born 1992), Turkish footballer
 Uğur Çimen (born 1975), Turkish football coach
 Uğur Dağdelen (born 1973), Turkish former footballer
 Uğur Demirkol (born 1990), Turkish footballer
 Uğur Demirok (born 1988), Turkish footballer
 Uğur Dündar (born 1943), Turkish journalist, political commentator, and writer
 Uğur Erdener (born 1950), Turkish academician and physician
 Uğur Erdoğan (born 1987), Turkish footballer
 Uğur Güneş (born 1987), Turkish film and television actor
 Uğur Güneş (born 1993), Turkish volleyball player
 Uğur Gürses, Turkish financial columnist
 Uğur Işıkal (born 1985), Turkish footballer
 Uğur İbrahimhakkıoğlu (born 1964), Turkish judge
 Uğur İnceman (born 1981), Turkish-German footballer
 Uğur Kapısız (born 1987), Turkish footballer
 Uğur Rıfat Karlova (born 1980), Turkish comedian, actor, and writer
 Uğur Kavuk (born 1979), Turkish footballer
 Uğur Köken (born 1937), Turkish former footballer
 Uğur Arslan Kuru (born 1989), Turkish footballer
 Uğur Mumcu (1942–1993), Turkish investigative journalist
 Uğur Orel Oral (born 1979), Turkish swimmer
 Uğur Pamuk (born 1989), Azerbaijani footballer
 Uğur Pektaş (born 1979), Turkish actor
 Uğur Polat (born 1961), Turkish actor
 Uğur Soldan (born 1978), Turkish author, critic, academician, and lecturer
 Uğur Şahin (born 1965), Turkish-German scientist, founder & CEO of Biontech
 Uğur Taner (born 1975), Turkish swimmer
 Uğur Tütüneker (born 1963), Turkish former footballer
 Uğur Uçar (born 1987), Turkish footballer
 Uğur Uluocak (1962–2003), Turkish outdoorsman, photographer, and editor
 Uğur Ümit Üngör (born 1980), Dutch scholar
 Uğur Yıldırım (born 1982), Turkish footballer
 Uğur Yücel (born 1957), Turkish film actor, producer, and director

Surname
 Özkan Uğur (born 1953), Turkish pop musician

Places
 Uğur, Düzce

References

Turkish masculine given names